Nagorski or Nagórski (feminine: Nagórska; plural: Nagórscy) is a Polish surname. It may refer to:

 Andrew Nagorski (born 1947), American journalist
 Jan Nagórski (1888–1976), Polish aviator

See also
 
 Nagurski
 Nagorsky (disambiguation)

Polish-language surnames